Metallurg Anosov may refer to:
Anosov Pavel Petrovich, tsarist Russian governor-general and metallurgist-scientist
Statue of Metallurgist Anosov, Zlatoust, monumental Statue of Anosov Pavel Petrovich in Zlatoust, Russia
, Soviet general cargo ship, which was a missile carrier also